Spade Ranch was the name of two separate West Texas ranches, both of which were linked through the innovation of barbed wire. The two were under separate ownership.

References

External links
Interview: with Mart "M.F." Driver, ranch hand at Spade Ranch, Library of Congress
Ellwood papers at Southwest Collection/Special Collections Library, Texas Tech University
Spade Ranch: Texas State Historical Association
Wolfforth, Texas: Texas State Historical Association
Ropesville, Texas: Texas State Historical Association
Spade: Texas State Historical Association

Ranches in Texas